Dan B. Allender, Ph.D., is a prominent Christian therapist, author, professor, and speaker focusing on sexual abuse and trauma recovery, as well as story, marriage and family, and Christian Sabbath. Dr. Allender received his Master of Divinity from Westminster Theological Seminary and his PhD in Counseling Psychology from Michigan State University. He has taught at Grace Theological Seminary (1983-1989), Colorado Christian University (1989-1997), and The Seattle School of Theology and Psychology (where he is still teaching as of 2020).

In 1997, Dr. Allender was one of the founders of The Seattle School of Theology & Psychology, in Seattle, Washington. He served as the President of The Seattle School from 2002 to 2009. He continues to serve as Professor of Counseling Psychology. He is a therapist in private practice, as well as a frequent speaker and seminar leader. Dr. Allender's focus is on sexual abuse and trauma, as well as recovery through story. He also writes about and speaks to the impact of abuse on relationship, marriage and family, and the Christian Sabbath.

Dr. Allender is the author of To Be Told: Know Your Story, Shape Your Future, How Children Raise Parents, and The Healing Path, as well as The Wounded Heart, Bold Love, Intimate Allies, and God Loves Sex.

The Allender Center 
In 2010, The Allender Center was launched as a non-profit organization within The Seattle School of Theology and Psychology dedicated to the training of counseling professionals working in the areas of trauma and abuse. The Allender Center is responsible for Dan Allender's conferences as well as certificate programs for professional development. The development options include online courses, conferences, workshops, trainings, and marriage retreats.

Through the Allender Center, Dan hosts The Allender Center podcast with Rachel Clinton Chen. The weekly episodes invite voices to speak to the complexities of the human experience. The podcast brings conversations that invite healing and restoration to a world that desperately needs to understand how to address the extent of harm and heartache so many have experienced. Their hope is to help others find transformation through the redemptive power of narrative.

Bibliography 

 The Wounded Heart (1990)
 Bold Love (1992)
 The Cry of the Soul: How Our Emotions Reveal Our Deepest Questions About God (with Tremper Longman, 1994)
 Intimate Allies (with Tremper Longman, 1999)
 The Healing Path: How the Hurts in Your Past Can Lead You to a More Abundant Life (2000)
 How Children Raise Parents: The Art of Listening to Your Family (2005)
 Sexual Intimacy: Intimate Marriage (with Tremper Longman, 2005)
 Leading With A Limp: Turning Your Struggles Into Strengths (2006)
 To Be Told: God Invites You to Coauthor Your Future (2006)
 Breaking the Idols of Your Heart: How to Navigate the Temptations of Life (with Tremper Longman, 2007)
 Sabbath (The Ancient Practices Series) (2009)
 God Loves Sex: An Honest conversation About Sexual Desire and Holiness'' (with Tremper Longman, 2014)

References

Living people
21st-century American psychologists
Year of birth missing (living people)